The 1937 Grand Prix season was the fifth AIACR European Championship season. The championship was won by Rudolf Caracciola, driving for the Mercedes-Benz team. Caracciola won three of the five events that counted towards the championship.

This season saw the most powerful Grand Prix cars so far, Mercedes-Benz supercharged 5.6L inline-8 engines boasting nearly 650 bhp. Considering that an average saloon car produced around 25 bhp at the time, the performance of these single-seaters was extremely high compared with any other season in modern motorsport; so much so that for the first time ever, regulations were put in force for the following year to limit the engines' size capacity to reduce their power and to add weight to the cars to make them slower. Mercedes-Benz's development of their technology was thanks almost entirely to the state-subsidies that they were receiving from the Nazi German government at the time. The amount of power the supercharged Mercedes-Benz W125's had was not equaled in racing cars until American Can-Am cars in the late 1960s, and European Grand Prix cars did not have this kind of power again until the early 1980s (a span of nearly 45 years), when Grand Prix racing had long since become Formula One.

Season review

European Championship Grands Prix

Non-championship Grands Prix

Championship final standings

References

 
 
 

Grand Prix seasons